Shamima Akhter Khanam is a Bangladesh Awami League politician and a member of Bangladesh National Parliament. She came from "reserved seat"(Sunamganj, Sylhet).

Career
Shamima, also known as Shamima Shahriar, was elected to Parliament from "reserved seat" as a Bangladesh Awami League candidate in 2019. She's an active & dedicated worker of the Bangladesh Awami League and the Joint General Secretary of Bangladesh Krishak League. She's a member of the Standing Committee of Fisheries & Livestock. She's also a member of the National Disaster Management Advisory Committee. She's also an Advocate of the Bangladesh Supreme Court.

References

Awami League politicians
Living people
Women members of the Jatiya Sangsad
11th Jatiya Sangsad members
21st-century Bangladeshi women politicians
21st-century Bangladeshi politicians
Year of birth missing (living people)